AaRON (Artificial Animals Riding On Neverland) is a French pop rock musical duo, consisting of Simon Buret and Olivier Coursier. Their debut album Artificial Animals Riding on Neverland was released in 2007 and made them popular in France and Europe. Their first tour of Europe was carried out in 2007 between March 14 and November 28, including dates in Spain, Switzerland, Belgium, Austria, Luxembourg. The second album, Birds in the Storm, was released in May 2010.

Members
 Simon Buret : singer, author and composer
 Olivier Coursier : composer and arranger

Discography

Studio albums

Singles

Covers
 On the first AaRON album, they covered the song "Strange Fruit", a song which was made famous by Billie Holiday. The version they perform on the album is drawn largely from Nina Simone's rendition on her 1965 album Pastel Blues.

Live albums
 2011: Waves from the Road (recorded live from the Unplugged & Waves tour)

Soundtracks
2006: Je vais bien, ne t'en fais pas (soundtrack of film) in 2 tracks:
"U-Turn (Lili)" – the song was integrated into the film as a song written by a character for his sister ; the character of the sister was then renamed to "Lili" to match the song. 
"Mister K."
2013: Les yeux fermés (soundtrack of film directed by Jessica Palud)

References

External links
Official webpage

French pop music groups